Billy Shreve (born November 16, 1967) is an American politician and realtor.

Early years 
Shreve was born and raised in Frederick County, Maryland. He graduated from Governor Thomas Johnson High School and received an associate's degree from Frederick Community College.

Professional career 
Shreve has worked in real estate since 1994. Shreve sells commercial real estate at the Frederick Land Company. He also sells residential homes for Natelli Communities, which developed Urbana, Maryland, and Main Street Homes.

Shreve also works as a ski and snowboard instructor at Whitetail Ski Resort in Mercersburg, Pennsylvania.

Political career

Frederick County Board of Commissioners
Shreve was one of a group of three politically conservative, pro-development candidates elected to the council in 2010; the others were Kirby Delauter and Blaine Young.  Together they dominated the 5-person Council.

2006 campaign
In 2006, while serving as chairman of the Frederick County Board of Zoning Appeals, Shreve ran as a Republican for a seat on the Frederick County Board of Commissioners.

Shreve said he would consider cutting the county's expenses and increasing taxes in order to eliminate the county's budget deficit. Shreve said that the only people who complain about taxes are senior citizens on a fixed income. He said he would freeze property taxes for property owners over 65, on a fixed-income, who have lived in the county for at least.

Shreve advocated for reducing county fees for building permits and infrastructure such as sewer hookup, claiming doing so would reduce the cost of homes.

Shreve blamed overdevelopment on the lack of planning by Frederick County, rather than by the developers who built the homes. Shreve said that Frederick County should spend its budget on its infrastructure, such as roads, schools, and water and sewer systems. Shreve supported building a Beltway around Frederick. Shreve supported giving people financial incentives to commute to work outside of rush hours in order to improve traffic.

Shreve said he would encourage developers to build affordable housing by waiving certain fees for affordable-housing projects; those county fees pay for schools and libraries. He would also create a land trust that would own the land on which affordable housing could be built; homeowners would then only own their homes, not the land the home sits on.

Shreve's candidacy was endorsed by Frederick Countians for Real Republicans Political Action Committee.

Shreve lost the Republican primary, coming in sixth place with ten percent of the vote.

2010 campaign
In 2009, Shreve announced he would run again for the Frederick County Board of Commissioners.

Shreve said that the five most important priorities in Frederick County were education, public safety, water, solid waste, and roads. He said that decreasing government spending, taxes, job creation, and illegal immigration were less important priorities.

Shreve's candidacy was endorsed by the Frederick County Teachers Association and the Frederick County Association of Realtors.

Shreve came in fourth place with ten percent of the vote in the Republican primary, advancing to the general election.

In the general election, Shreve won a seat on the Frederick County Board of Commissioners, coming in third place with twelve percent of the vote.

Responding to comments that the incoming Frederick County Board of Commissioners would have no women serving for the first time since 1978, Shreve said, "It would be like saying there are no Asians on the board, or no Hispanics. Everyone has their own issues, but I think in general, people are all alike."

Shreve was sworn in on December 1, 2010.

First term
The editorial board of The Frederick News-Post criticized Shreve for missing, arriving late, or leaving early for 4 out of 56 weekly Board of Education meetings. During one such meeting, Shreve left the meeting just before the vote on whether to approve the school budget. In a letter to the editor, Shreve debated the definition of the word meeting, the importance of the meetings, and whether he is legally required to attend the meetings.

As a cost-saving measure, Shreve said he would consider layoffs of ten percent or more of the county government's employees. Shreve also supported cutting funding to the county's critical farms program, which supports establishing new farms or enlarging established farms.

Shreve supported increasing the tuition at Frederick Community College.

Shreve opposed building a new library in Walkersville, saying that having a library in the Walkersville Middle School was sufficient.

When fellow Commissioner David Gray said that members of the Board of Commissioners should not treat it as a part-time position, Shreve disagreed. Shreve said he works between ten and twenty hours per week as a Commissioner. Shreve stated Commissioners should leave most aspects of governing to government employees, saying, "You don't add anything to the equation most of the time. Most of the time you just screw things up."

Frederick County Council

2014 campaign
In 2014, Shreve ran as a Republican candidate for one of the two at-large positions on the first elected council of Frederick County. Shreve was one of thirteen candidates for the two at-large seats.

Shreve said that overcrowding was not a problem in county schools. Shreve said that he would prefer to have classes taught in trailers on school grounds rather than build more schools.

On the subject of teenagers who abuse prescription drugs, Shreve said the solution was to increase education.

Shreve and Bud Otis won the Republican primary election, advancing to the general election. Shreve received 24 percent of the vote.

In the general election, Shreve won an at-large seat on the Council with 25 percent of the total vote. Shreve was sworn in on December 1, 2014.

First term
Two weeks prior to the swearing-in ceremony, there was an orientation for future Frederick County Council members, where ethics rules, office setup, and communication were discussed. Shreve did not attend. The Maryland Association of Counties also held an orientation for newly elected officials, which Shreve did not attend.

Shreve abstained from virtually all budget-related votes, saying he would continue to do so until he has a larger staff that can advise him. Shreve abstained from over sixty such votes in 2015. When County Executive Jan Gardner invited each council member to meet with her to discuss the proposed budget, Shreve declined the offer. Shreve has also complained that he was not assigned a parking spot at the county's government building and that it took too long to get a key to his office.

Shreve opposed a proposal to increase the county's hotel tax from three percent to five percent, some of which would fund construction and improvements to conference halls and exhibit halls in the county. Shreve also opposed a bill to fund part of the construction of a hotel and conference center in downtown Frederick.

Shreve supported selling a county-owned nursing home, Citizens Care and Rehabilitation Center and Montevue Assisted Living, to a private company.

On a bill to make it easier for the Frederick County Sheriff's Office to enforce noise violations, Shreve voted against. Shreve said he opposed making it unlawful to operate an off-road vehicle within 300 feet of an adjoining property.

Shreve proposed cutting the county's budget for snow removal by $1.2 million. His proposal did not pass the council.

On a bill to make it unlawful to tamper with a fire hydrant, subject to a fine of up to $1,000, Shreve voted against the bill.

Shreve voted against a bill to increase identification of human-trafficking victims and create a provider network for comprehensive services to victims of human trafficking.

The Church of Scientology requested historical designation for Trout Run in order to use it as a Narconon rehabilitation center for drug addicts. Shreve was the only member of the council to vote in favor, saying that he was afraid the council would be sued if they did not approve it.

In 2016, Shreve organized a film contest for K–12 students aimed to create awareness against the use of drugs.

Maryland Senate

2018 campaign 
In 2018, Shreve ran to represent District 3 in the Maryland Senate. In the Republican primary election, Shreve came in second place with 24 percent of the vote.

Electoral history

2006

2010

2014

2018

References

External links
 
 
 

Living people
Politicians from Frederick, Maryland
Maryland Republicans
1967 births